Francielle Manoel Alberto (born 18 October 1989), commonly known as Francielle or Fran, is a Brazilian footballer who plays as a midfielder for the Brazil women's national football team. At club level she most recently played for Norwegian Toppserien club Avaldsnes IL. She previously played for Corinthians, São José and Santos in Brazil, as well as for Saint Louis Athletica and Sky Blue FC of Women's Professional Soccer (WPS).

Playing career

Club

United States
Francielle was on the opening day roster for St. Louis Athletica in the inaugural season of the WPS in 2009, and played in six matches for them.

On 26 June 2009, St. Louis Athletica traded Francielle and Kerri Hanks to Sky Blue FC for Sarah Walsh. She scored the game-winning goal in the first round of the WPS playoffs at the Washington Freedom. Sky Blue later defeated Francielle's former team, the Athletica, and the Los Angeles Sol to win the 2009 WPS title.

Brazil
Francielle won the 2009 Copa Libertadores Femenina with Santos.

In 2013 Francielle and São José won the Copa Libertadores. In 2013 and 2014 she and her team also won league and cup titles.

Boston Breakers
10 November 2014 the Boston Breakers signed Francielle for the 2015 NWSL season. Ultimately she never joined the Breakers as she was instead called into Brazil's residency camp for the 2015 FIFA Women's World Cup.

Stjarnan
In summer 2015 Francielle and compatriot Poliana agreed to play for Icelandic Úrvalsdeild club Stjarnan in their UEFA Women's Champions League campaign.

Avaldsnes
After spending 2016 back in Brazil with Corinthians Audax, Francielle joined a Brazilian contingent at Avaldsnes IL. She helped the team win the 2017 Norwegian Women's Cup, before departing during the 2018 Toppserien season.

International
In November 2006 Francielle made her senior international debut in Brazil's 2–0 South American Women's Football Championship win over Peru at Estadio José María Minella, Mar del Plata.

Francielle appeared in all four of Brazil's matches at the 2011 Women's World Cup, and converted a penalty kick in the overtime shootout of the quarterfinal match versus the United States. In the 2008 Beijing Olympics, Francielle appeared in five of Brazil's six matches, winning a silver medal. Francielle's first goal in a major international tournament came at the 2012 London Olympics versus Cameroon, where she played in all four of Brazil's matches.

In October 2017 Francielle was one of five Brazil players to quit international football, disgruntled at pay and conditions, and the Brazilian Football Confederation's sacking of head coach Emily Lima.

International goals

Personal life
Francielle is married to Andressa Alves.

References

External links

 
 
 Sky Blue FC player profile
 Santos FC player profile 
 

1989 births
Living people
Footballers from São Paulo
Brazilian women's footballers
Women's association football midfielders
Olympic footballers of Brazil
Olympic silver medalists for Brazil
Footballers at the 2008 Summer Olympics
Footballers at the 2012 Summer Olympics
NJ/NY Gotham FC players
Saint Louis Athletica players
2011 FIFA Women's World Cup players
Olympic medalists in football
Santos FC (women) players
Medalists at the 2008 Summer Olympics
Brazil women's international footballers
Brazilian expatriate women's footballers
Brazilian expatriate sportspeople in the United States
Expatriate women's footballers in Iceland
Expatriate women's soccer players in the United States
Pan American Games silver medalists for Brazil
Pan American Games medalists in football
Sport Club Corinthians Paulista (women) players
Stjarnan women's football players
Footballers at the 2011 Pan American Games
Brazilian expatriate sportspeople in Iceland
Avaldsnes IL players
Toppserien players
Brazilian expatriate sportspeople in Norway
Expatriate women's footballers in Norway
São José Esporte Clube (women) players
LGBT association football players
Brazilian LGBT sportspeople
Medalists at the 2011 Pan American Games
Women's Professional Soccer players
Association footballers' wives and girlfriends